Caplet may refer to:

Interest rate caps, usually forming part of a series of caps and/or floors within a derivative contract
Caplet, a smooth, coated, oval-shaped medicinal tablet in the shape of a capsule
André Caplet (1878–1925), French composer and conductor, early 20th century
VG Pocket Caplet, a portable videogame system created by Performance Designed Products and Pelican Products